Jay Patterson (born August 22, 1954 in Cincinnati, Ohio) is an American actor. He appeared in more than sixty films since 1984.

Selected filmography

Film

Television

Videogames

References

External links 

1954 births
Living people
American male film actors
People from Cincinnati
American male television actors